Gummy bear is a fruit gum candy.

Gummy Bear may also refer to:
Gummibär, a viral character band
Gummy bear song, a song by "Gummibar"
"GummyBear", a song by Mini Mansions from their 2019 album Guy Walks Into a Bar...

See also
Gummi Bears (disambiguation)